George M. Harrison may be:

George Moffett Harrison (1847-1923), Virginia politician and judge
George McGregor Harrison (1895-1968), American labor leader